Danyang County (Danyang-gun) is in North Chungcheong Province, South Korea.

Symbols
County tree: Yew tree
County bird: Magpie
County flower: Royal Azalea

Geography
The geographical terrain is 83.7% mountainous and 11.2% cultivable. It is very rugged, except in some of the urban areas and villages that can be found in the valleys and hills. Pyeongchang River, one of the streams flowing from Odaesan, joins several streams at Jungnyeong, Danyang, and Geumgok, originating from Sobaeksan. Danyang Stream, which has its source in Hakseongsan, Gyeongsangbuk-do, joins the Namhan River at Habang-ri, Danseong-myeon, together with Jungnyeong Stream flowing from Jungnyeong and Dosolsan to Hyeoncholli, Danyang-eup, Maepo Stream from Geumsusan to Dodam, and Geumgok Stream from Biro Peak to Gosu-ri, Danyang-eup.

Climate
Danyang has a monsoon-influenced humid continental climate (Köppen: Dwa) with cold, dry winters and hot, rainy summers. The county, which is situated in an inland mountainous area, epitomizes an inland climate with severe variations in temperatures.

Tourism
 Gosu Cave
 Eight Views of Danyang

Twin towns – sister cities

Danyang is twinned with:

Domestic
 Songpa-gu, Seoul 
 Eunpyeong-gu, Seoul
 Jung-gu, Busan
 Gyeyang-gu, Incheon
 Boryeong, South Chungcheong
 Icheon, Gyeonggi
 Guri, Gyeonggi

International
  Antu County, Jilin, China
  Danyang, Jiangsu, China

Gallery

References

External links

County government home page (in English)
County government home page (in Korean)

 
Counties of North Chungcheong Province